Mycielin may refer to the following places:
Mycielin, Kalisz County in Greater Poland Voivodeship (west-central Poland)
Mycielin, Krotoszyn County in Greater Poland Voivodeship (west-central Poland)
Mycielin, Lubusz Voivodeship (west Poland)
Mycielin, Warmian-Masurian Voivodeship (north Poland)